Tigerair Taiwan is a low-cost carrier (LCC) based at Taoyuan International Airport. It was formed as a joint venture between China Airlines Group and Budget Aviation Holdings.

Prior to 2016, China Airlines held 80 percent of the share while Budget Aviation Holdings and Mandarin Airlines each held 10 percent. In 2017, as Tigerair Singapore merged into Scoot, CAPA reported that China Airlines had purchased Budget Aviation Holdings' 10% stake, leaving China Airlines and its subsidiary Mandarin Airlines as joint owners of the airline. It is the only LCC in Taiwan following the collapse of TransAsia Airways and V Air in 2016 and also the only airline left with Tigerair branding, as Tigerair Australia and the rest had ceased operations by end of 2020.

History

Taiwan was the last major market in Asia to not have a low-cost carrier (LCC). In early 2013, China Airlines and Transasia Airways became the first Taiwanese carriers to express interest in forming an LCC. The further reduction in entry barriers by the Civil Aeronautics Administration made it favorable for the creation of LCCs.

In October 2013, China Airlines chairman Sun Hung-Hsiang announced that the airline was in talks with a foreign LCC to start an LCC based in Taiwan. The partnership was made public in December 2013 when China Airlines created a new joint venture with Singaporean low-cost carrier Tigerair to establish Tigerair Taiwan. As part of the deal, China Airlines would hold a 90 percent share in the new carrier with Tiger Airways Holdings owning the other 10 percent. In March 2014, China Airlines subsidiary Mandarin Airlines took over 10% of its parent company's share in Tigerair Taiwan.

In September 2014, Tigerair Taiwan received an Air Operator's Certificate from the Civil Aeronautics Administration. The airline then commenced operations on 26 September 2014, with the first flight being from Taoyuan International Airport to Changi Airport.

Livery

All Tigerair Taiwan aircraft wear the Tigerair group livery along while having the words "TAIWAN" painted onto the rear of the fuselage. The airline is the first international carrier to have the word 'Taiwan' as part of a corporate livery or a company name.

Destinations
Tigerair Taiwan serves the following destinations:

Fleet
As of July 2022, the Tigerair Taiwan fleet consists of the following aircraft:

See also

 List of airports in Taiwan
 List of airlines of Taiwan
 List of companies of Taiwan
 Transportation in Taiwan
 Air transport in Taiwan

References

China Airlines Group
China Airlines
Airlines of Taiwan
Airlines established in 2013
Low-cost carriers